Al-Azm Palace is a palace in Damascus, Syria, built in 1749. Located north of Al-Buzuriyah Souq in the Ancient City of Damascus, the palace was built in 1749 to be the private residence for As'ad Pasha al-Azm, the governor of Damascus; during the French Mandate for Syria and the Lebanon, it housed the French Institute.

After being purchased by the Syrian government from the Al-Azm family and undergoing several reconstruction works, the palace now houses the Museum of Arts and Popular Traditions.

History

The palace was built during the Ottoman era over the former site of a Mamluk palace as a residence for the governor of Damascus, As'ad Pasha al-Azm during the reign of Sultan Mahmud I. Serving as a joint residence and guesthouse, the palace was a monument to 18th-century Arab architecture. The palace was built by 800 workers in a span of three years, and the building was decorated with highly sophisticated and expensive decorative elements. A local Damascene barber, Shaikh Ahmad Al-Bidiri Al-Halaq recorded in his diary how "every time he [Al-Azem] heard of an antiquity or rare work of marble or porcelain, he would send someone to get it - with or without the owner's consent". After al-Azm's death, the palace continued to house his descendants for generations later.

While touring Damascus in 1898, Emperor Wilhelm II of Germany visited the palace.

The palace remained in the ownership of the Azm family until 1920, when the palace was sold to the French. The central court or haremlek was purchased for 4000 gold pounds (after 1958 the currency unit name in English changed from "Lira" to "Pound"). During the Great Syrian Revolution, the French government shelled Damascus to put down the rebellion, and the old quarter of Damascus was shelled which caused extensive damage to the palace, as the main reception room, the private baths and the roofs were all set on fire while the walls were destroyed. Following the end of the revolution, the French government set about reconstructing the buildings. The restoration work began immediately and was handled by architects Lucien Cavaro, and Michel Ecochard. The architects conducted a simplified, less ornate reconstruction of the palace.

Following reconstruction, the French government used the palace to house the newly created French Institute, and Michel Ecochard, who worked in reconstructing the site, was commissioned to design a new house for the director of the institute. Although fairly modern, the new building blended perfectly into the 18th century walls of the palace.

Upon Syrian independence in 1946, the French Institute was dissolved and evacuated from the building and the house was returned to the Azm family, six years later in 1951 it was purchased by the Syrian government for 100,000 pounds ($30,000), which turned it into the Museum of Arts and Popular Traditions. Shafiq Imam was appointed the director of the museum, which opened in 1954. The crowd for the museum's opening greatly exceeded expectations that led Shafiq Imam to design a new staircase for the main hall to allow visitors to enter from one side and leave from another. 

The palace received the Aga Khan Award for Architecture in 1983.

Architecture

The palace is 6400 m², and its architecture is an excellent example of Damascene traditional houses. The structure consists of several buildings and three wings: the harem, the selamlek and the khademlek. The harem is the family wing, which contains the private residences of the family and includes the baths, which are a replica of the public baths in the city on a smaller scale. The selamlek is the guest wing, and it comprises the formal halls, reception areas and large courtyards with traditional cascading fountain, while in the northern part of the palace were the servant quarters and the center of housekeeping activities.

One of the palace's most interesting parts is the hammam, or baths. It is composed of a succession of small rooms and narrow corridors leading to the main steam room in the heart of the building. Near the hammam is the main marble-floored reception hall, and behind it is a second, smaller courtyard with a number of rooms now used to display various traditional crafts such as glass, copper and textiles.

Used in the building of this palace were several types of stones including limestone, sandstone, basalt, and marble, chosen to provide a natural decoration. The ceilings have painted wooden panels that display natural scenes. 

Dr. Andrew Petersen, director of Research in Islamic Archaeology at the University of Wales Lampeter states that the use of ablaq (alternating courses of white limestone and black basalt) in this building is “A characteristic of the monumental masonry of Damascus.”

See also
 Ablaq
 Azem Palace (Hama)

References

External links

Old Damascene houses
Palaces in Syria
Museums in Syria
Houses completed in 1750
Buildings and structures inside the walled city of Damascus
1750 establishments in Ottoman Syria
18th-century establishments in Ottoman Syria